Puttaparthi revenue division is an administrative division in the Sri Sathya Sai district of the Indian state of Andhra Pradesh. It is one of the four revenue divisions in the district and comprises six mandals. The division was newly created along with the district on 4 April 2022.

Administration 
The revenue division comprises six mandals: Bukkapatnam, Gorantla, Kothacheruvu, Nallamada, Obuladevaracheruvu and Puttaparthi.

References 

Revenue divisions in Sri Sathya Sai district
2022 establishments in Andhra Pradesh